Yongji is a county of central Jilin province, China, located just  outside of Jilin City.

2010 floods

More than 30,000 people in the town of Kouqian were trapped by floodwaters in July 2010 when all communication routes to the area were snapped. 200 rescue workers were dispatched to rescue the inhabitants.

Administrative divisions
, the county administers seven towns and two townships.

Climate

References

External links

Jilin City
County-level divisions of Jilin